Algonquin-class cutter may refer to:
 Algonquin-class cutter (1934), a United States Coast Guard cutter class
 Algonquin-class cutter (1898), a United States Revenue Cutter Service ship class that included  and